Banjul American International School (BAIS) is an American international school in the Banjul area of the Gambia. Formerly titled the Banjul American Embassy School (BAES), the school serves preschool through high school.

Overview 
The school is accredited through 2023 by the Middle States Association of Schools and Colleges. It uses the American Education Reaches Out (AERO) Standards as the base of inquiry-based units planned through the Understanding by Design approach.  The school held its 35th anniversary in 2019.

American parents established the school in January 1984 after feeling dissatisfied with the education in the Marina International School, which had previously educated American children.  The BAES high school began operations in 2012. The University of Nebraska–Lincoln provides high school correspondence courses to students at BAES. 

Student results on external standardized testing show the majority of students achieving above norms and students have left BAIS to find success in schools around the world.

See also

 Education in the Gambia
 List of international schools
 List of schools in the Gambia

References

External links
 , the school's official website

1984 establishments in the Gambia
American international schools in Africa
Buildings and structures in Banjul
Educational institutions established in 1984
Elementary and primary schools in the Gambia
International high schools
International schools in the Gambia
High schools and secondary schools in the Gambia